Artus Gheerdinck (1564–1624) was a Dutch harpsichord builder.

Gheerdinck lived and worked in Amsterdam, where he was appointed carillonneur of the Oude Kerk (Old Church) in 1595. This was the same time period that Sweelinck was organist there. Gheerdinck had a workshop in an attic space at the church, and tuned both the church’s organs.  There was also a Harmanus Gheerdinck living in Amsterdam in the mid-1600s, but his relation (if any) to Artus is unknown. Harmanus was also a harpsichord builder.

A single instrument by Artus Gheerdinck survives, a rectangular virginal. It has the range C/E – c´´´ (four octaves), and is currently housed in the Germanisches Nationalmuseum in Nuremberg, Germany (Inventory No. MINe 95).

O’Brien believes that a harpsichord attributed to Hans Ruckers may actually be by Artus Gheerdinck. Though its present range is C—c´´´, its original range was C/E—c´´´. It is currently in the Germanisches Nationalmuseum (Inventory No. MINe 84).

Discography

Jan Pieterszoon Sweelinck: Organ & Keyboard Music. Siegbert Rampe. MDG 341 1256-2. Dabringhaus und Grimm, 2004
Peter Philips: Complete Organ & Keyboard Works. Vol. 1. Siegbert Rampe. MDG 341 1257-2. Dabringhaus und Grimm, 2005

Notes

References

Boalch, D.: Makers of the Harpsichord and Clavichord 1440-1840. Third edition, ed. Charles Mould. Clarendon Press, 1995
O’Brien, G.: Ruckers: A Harpsichord and Virginal Building Tradition. Cambridge University Press, 1990

External links
Gheerdinck’s virginal is illustrated here.
Further information on this instrument, including a sound sample, may be found here.
Georg Ott built an instrument based on Gheerdinck’s virginal.
J.C. Neupert also offers a virginal based on Gheerdinck’s.
The harpsichord attributed to Hans Ruckers, but which may be by Gheerdinck, is described and illustrated here.

1564 births
1624 deaths
Carillonneurs
Harpsichord makers
Dutch musical instrument makers
Businesspeople from Amsterdam